Casimcea is a commune in Tulcea County, Northern Dobruja, Romania. It is composed of six villages: Casimcea, Cișmeaua Nouă (historical name: Ramazanchioi), Corugea, Haidar, Rahman and Războieni (historical name: Alifacâ). 

The name of the commune is of Turkish origin, being derived from the word Kasım, itself from the Arabic Qasim, "one who distributes". The suffix "cea" is a Romanianization of the Turkish -ça.

Famous residents
Ion Jalea (1887 - 1983), sculptor, academician

References

External links
  Official site

Communes in Tulcea County
Localities in Northern Dobruja
Place names of Turkish origin in Romania